Aik Keow Chinese Primary school  is also known as SRJK (C) Aik Keow, (Chinese :日落斗哇益侨华文小学) is located in Kampung Telok Ayer Tawar, North Seberang Perai District in Penang state of Malaysia.

The Motto of The School

爱吾益侨 I love Aik Keow

History of The School

1930—the school commenced.
1941—world war 2 destroyed the school building and all the teaching and learning halted.
1945—the school recommenced the teaching and learning.

Geographical Location of The School

It is located in Teluk Air Tawar, Butterworth.
Butterworth is the mainland peninsula of Malaysia.
The school has a 1.3 acres of land (0.5263 hectare)

Committee of the School

Director: Mr HOO Lay Hock
Chairperson of Parent-Teacher Association: Mr YEU Guan Chuan
President of the Ex-pupils' Association: Mr SIM Eing Liong

School Administration

2013 session

Head of the School: Ms CHUAH Gek Kim
1st school head assistant : Mr Thor Kean Khey
2nd school head assistant : Ms HOO Yen See
Head of Ex-curriculum department: Ms TEOH Choe Yoong

School Enrollment and Staff

2013 session

Pupils: 167 boys and girls
staff (teaching and non teaching): 16 persons

2013 session

 Pupils: 175 boys and girls
 Staff remains unchanged

School Facilities

 A mini school library
 A small school canteen
 A multipurpose hall
 12 classrooms

What is on Aik Keow

2009

 The SARS forced the school to close for a week 

2011

 The Astro Television Chinese section visited the school for introducing the Recycle programme to the pupils
 The school participated in the Recycle programme for making soap.
 The school participated in the speech contest 

2012

 The housing developer next to the school did not take necessary precaution to avoid the noise and the digging of the man-made lake was posing danger of collapsing to the school building.
 The local council helped to collect old books for the poor schools in the region, including Aik Keow primary school 
 The school is suffering from the termite problem

Contact

Sekolah Jenis Kebangsaan (C) Aik Keow,
Teluk Air Tawar
13050 Butterworth
Pulau Pinang
Malaysia
Telefono: 604-3513455
Fax: 604-3513455

References

External links

Schools in Penang